Charles Cocks, 1st Baron Somers (29 June 1725 – 30 January 1806), known as Sir Charles Cocks, 1st Baronet, from 1772 to 1784, was a British politician who sat in the House of Commons from 1747 to 1784.

Life

Cocks was the son of John Cocks and his wife Mary Cocks who was his cousin and daughter of Thomas Cocks of Castleditch and was born on 29 June 1725. His paternal grandfather Charles Cocks was the husband of Mary Somers, sister of John Somers, 1st Baron Somers, Lord Chancellor of England. He matriculated at Worcester College, Oxford in 1742 and entered Lincoln's Inn in 1745, where he was called to the bar in 1750.

Cocks was elected Member of Parliament for Reigate in the 1747 general election and held the seat until 1784. He was appointed Clerk of Deliveries of the Ordnance from 1758 to 1772 and Clerk of the Ordnance from 1772 to 1782.

He succeeded his father in 1771 and the following year was created a baronet of Dumbleton in the County of Gloucester, and on 17 May 1784 the barony inherited from his great-uncle was revived when he was raised to the peerage as Baron Somers, of Evesham in the County of Worcester.

He is buried in Eastnor, Herefordshire with a monument sculpted by William Humphries Stephens.

Family

Lord Somers married, firstly, Elizabeth, daughter of Richard Eliot and Harriot, natural daughter of James Craggs the Younger, in 1759. After her death in 1771 he married, secondly, Anne, daughter of Reginald Pole, in 1772. There were children from both marriages. Cocks was succeeded in his titles by his son from his first marriage, John, who was created Earl Somers in 1821. Anne, Lady Somers, died in 1833.

References

 
 
 

1725 births
1806 deaths
Alumni of Worcester College, Oxford
Members of Lincoln's Inn
1
Peers of Great Britain created by George III
Members of the Parliament of Great Britain for English constituencies
British MPs 1747–1754
British MPs 1754–1761
British MPs 1761–1768
British MPs 1768–1774
British MPs 1774–1780
British MPs 1780–1784